Fort Harrison Terminal Station, also known as Fort Harrison Post Office, is a historic train station located at Fort Benjamin Harrison in suburban Lawrence Township, Marion County, Indiana, northeast of Indianapolis, Indiana.  It was built in 1908, and is a one-story, brick building with Prairie School and Bungalow / American Craftsman style design elements.  It has a low, double pitched hipped roof sheathed in metal.  It served as a terminal for the interurban Union Traction Company until 1941, after which it housed a U.S. Post Office. It has been converted into a Mexican restaurant.

It was added to the National Register of Historic Places in 1984.

References

External links

Railway stations on the National Register of Historic Places in Indiana
Bungalow architecture in Indiana
Railway stations in the United States opened in 1908
Buildings and structures in Indianapolis
National Register of Historic Places in Indianapolis
Transportation buildings and structures in Marion County, Indiana